Ma Yongbin (born 20 April 1981) is a Chinese speed skater. He competed in the men's 1500 metres event at the 2002 Winter Olympics.

References

1981 births
Living people
Chinese male speed skaters
Olympic speed skaters of China
Speed skaters at the 2002 Winter Olympics
Place of birth missing (living people)